The Canadian Stage Company is based in Toronto, and is Canada's third-largest not-for-profit contemporary theatre company. Founded in 1987 with the merger of CentreStage and Toronto Free Theatre, Canadian Stage is dedicated to programming international contemporary theatre and to developing and producing Canadian works.

, the following is a chronological list of the productions which have been staged as part of Canadian Stage since its inception.

1987–1988
Glengarry Glen Ross – by David Mamet
B-Movie, the play – by Tom Wood
Nothing Sacred – by George F. Walker
Jitters – by David French
The Tempest – By William Shakespeare

1988–1989
Woyzeck – by Georg Büchner
A Map of the World – by David Hare
Donut City – by Douglas Rodger
Odd Jobs – by Frank Moher
Hunting Cockroaches – by Janusz Glowacki
The Threepenny Opera – by Bertolt Brecht and Kurt Weill
1949 – by David French
Yesteryear – by Joanna McClelland Glass
The Bourgeois Gentlemen – by Molière
What the Butler Saw – by Joe Orton
Incognito
Blood Brothers – by Willy Russell
Kiss of the Spider Woman – by Manuel Puig
Valentine Brown – by Susan Cox

1989–1990
Our Country's Good – by Timberlake Wertenbaker
The Trial of Judith K. – by Sally Clark
The Show-Off – by George Kelly
The Legend of Avro Arrow – by Clinton Bomphrey
Fire – by Paul Ledoux and David Young
Breaking the Code – by Hugh Whitemore
The Comedy of Errors – by William Shakespeare
I.D. – by Antony Sher
Goodnight Desdemona (Good Morning Juliet) – by Ann-Marie MacDonald
Almost A Comedy
The Invention of Poetry – by Paul Quarrington
The Recruiting Officer – by George Farquhar

1990–1991
Divided We Stand
Possible Worlds – by John Mighton
Of the Fields, Lately – by David French
Speed the Plow – by David Mamet
The Passion of Narcisse – by Mondoux
The Importance of Being Earnest – by Oscar Wilde
The Dreamland – by Raymond Storey and John Roby
The Comedy of Errors – by William Shakespeare
La Maison Suspendue – by Michel Tremblay

1991–1992
Avant La Guerre A L'Anse a Gille – by Marie Laberge
Suits – by Richard Green and Peter Wildman
Awful Manors – by Ronnie Burkett
Not Wanted on the Voyage – by Timothy Findley, adapted by D.D. Kugler and Richard Rose
The Wingfield Trilogy – by Dan Needles
Singer – by Peter Flannery
To Grandmother's House We Go – by Joanna Glass
Tartuffe – by Molière
Shirley Valentine – by Willy Russell
As You Like It – by William Shakespeare

1992–1993
Shirley Valentine – by Willy Russell
Flowers – by Deb Porter
Blue Dragons – by Gordon Armstrong
The Queens – by Normand Chaurette
Wingfield Trilogy – by Dan Needles
Silver Dagger – by David French
La Bete – by David Hirson
Rat Bag – by Martha Ross and John Millard
Fallen Angels – by Noël Coward
Richard III – by William Shakespeare
Edward IV – by William Shakespeare
Henry VI – by William Shakespeare
Hour Company – by Collective

1993–1994
Once on This Island – book and lyrics by Lynn Ahrens, music by Stephen Flaherty
Rough Crossing – by Tom Stoppard
Twelfth Night – by William Shakespeare
Death and the Maiden – by Ariel Dorfman
Dancing at Lughnasa – by Brian Friel
Homeward Bound – by Elliott Hayes
If We Are Women – by Joanna McClelland Glass

1994–1995
Oleanna – by David Mamet
The Wooden Hill – by Don Hannah
Twelfth Night – by William Shakespeare
Hay Fever – by Noël Coward
Poor Superman – by Brad Fraser
Six Degrees of Separation – by John Guare
The Monument – by Colleen Wagner
Transit of Venus – by Maureen Hunter
Into the Woods – by Stephen Sondheim and James Lepine

1995–1996
Keely and Du – by Jane Martin
Tinka's New Dress – by Ronnie Burkett
Dr Jekyll and Mr Hyde - A Love Story – by James W. Nichol
The Glorious 12th – by Raymond Storey
Lips Together, Teeth Apart – by Terrence McNally
A Midsummer Night's Dream – by William Shakespeare
Hard Hearts – by Elliott Hayes
Later Life – by A. R. Gurney
A Little Night Music – lyrics by Stephen Sondheim, book by Hugh Wheeler

1996–1997
Arcadia – by Tom Stoppard
Angels in America – by Tony Kushner
Thirteen Hands – by Carol Shields
Atlantis – by Maureen Hunter
Private Lives – by Noël Coward
Passion – by Stephen Sondheim and James Lapine
A Midsummer Night's Dream – by William Shakespeare

1997–1998
Trainspotting – by Irvine Welsh, adapted by Harry Gibson
A Delicate Balance – by Edward Albee
The House of Martin Guerre – by Leslie Arden
Romeo and Juliet – by William Shakespeare
Harlem Duet – by Djanet Sears
Molly Sweeney – by Brian Friel
Wingfield Bound – by Dan Needles
Claptrap – by Tom Wood

1998–1999
Mump and Smoot – by Michael Kennard and John Turner
A Common Man's Guide to Loving Women – by Andrew Moodie
Stone Angel – by Margaret Laurence
How I Learned to Drive – by Paula Vogel
Les Belles Souers – by Michel Tremblay
Romeo and Juliet – by William Shakespeare
The Norbals – by Brian Drader
Billy Bishop Goes to War – by John Gray and Eric Peterson

1999–2000
Heaven – by George F Walker
Leslie Arden and Friends in Concert – by Leslie Arden
Street of Blood – by Ronnie Burkett
Communicating Doors – by Alan Ayckbourn
Patience – by Jason Sherman
The Beauty Queen of Leenane – by Martin McDonagh
For The Pleasure of Seeing Her Again – by Michel Tremblay
The Overcoat – by Morris Panych and Wendy Gorling
Rock 'n' Roll – by John Gray

2000–2001
Outrageous – by Brad Fraser and Joey Miller
Hysteria – by Terry Johnson
The Weir – by Conor McPherson
Larry's Party – by Carol Shields, adapted by Richard Ouzounian and Marek Norman
Happy – by Ronnie Burkett
Wit – by Margaret Edson
Closer – by Patrick Marber
Goodnight Desdemona (Good Morning Juliet) – by Ann-Marie MacDonald
The Taming of the Shrew – by William Shakespeare

2001–2002
Habitat – by Judith Thompson
Tillsonburg – by Malachy McKenna
Picasso at Lapin Agile – by Steve Martin
The Lonesome West – by Martin McDonagh
Lost Boys – by R. H. Thompson
The Edible Woman – novel by Margaret Atwood, adapted by Dave Carley
Adam Baum and the Jew Movie – by Daniel Goldfarb
Indian Ink – by Tom Stoppard
The Tempest – by William Shakespeare

2002–2003
The Shape of Things – by Neil Labute
Proof – by David Auburn
The Beard of Avon – by Amy Freed
Sunday Father – by Adam Pettle
Vinci – by Maureen Hunter
Boy Gets Girl – by Rebecca Gilman
Sweeney Todd – by Stephen Sondheim
Rice Boy – by Sunil Kuruvilla
A Midsummer Night's Dream – by William Shakespeare

2003–2004
Blue/Orange – by Joe Penhall
Amadeus – by Peter Shaffer
Cookin' at the Cookery – by Marion J. Caffey
Provenance – by Ronnie Burkett
Written on Water – by Michel Marc Bouchard
The Syringa Tree – by Pamela Gien
Pélagie – by Vincent de Tourdonnet and Allen Cole
The Last 5 Years – by Jason Robert Brown
Urinetown – music by Mark Hollmann, lyrics by Mark Hollmann and Greg Kotis
Twelfth Night, or What You Will – by William Shakespeare
The Overcoat – by Morris Panych and Wendy Gorling
Mosley and Me – by Adam Pettle

2004–2005
Omnium Gatherum – by Theresa Rebeck and Alexandra Gersten-Vassilaros
Vigil – by Morris Panych
Side by Side by Sondheim – by Stephen Sondheim
The Glass Menagerie – by Tennessee Williams
Take Me Out – by Richard Greenberg
Unless – by Carol Shields and Sara Cassidy
My Mother's Feet – by Gina Wilkinson
Ain't Misbehavin' – by Richard Maltby, Jr.
Trying – by Joanna Glass
As You Like It – by William Shakespeare

2005–2006
Habeas Corpus – by Alan Bennett
The Goat, or Who Is Sylvia? – by Edward Albee
Crowns – by Regina Taylor
Homechild – by Joan MacLeod
A Number – by Caryl Churchill
Letters From Lehrer – by Richard Greenblatt
I Am My Own Wife – by Doug Wright
Hair – book and lyrics by James Rado and Gerome Ragni, music by Galt MacDermot
10 Days on Earth – by Ronnie Burkett
Much Ado About Nothing – by William Shakespeare

2006–2007
Of Mice and Men – by John Steinbeck
The Story of My Life – music and lyrics by Neil Bartram, book by Brian Hill
Glorious! – by Peter Quilter
Half Life – by John Mighton
What Lies Before Us – by Morris Panych
The Overcoat – by Morris Panych and Wendy Gorling
Lucy – by Damien Atkins
The Rocky Horror Show – by Richard O'Brien
The Comedy of Errors – by William Shakespeare

2007–2008
The Pillowman – by Martin McDonagh
The Elephant Man – by Bernard Pomerance
Little Shop of Horrors – by Howard Ashman and Alan Menken
The Palace of the End – by Judith Thomson
The Clean House – by Sarah Ruhl
Fire – by Paul Ledoux and David Young
Misery – by Stephen King
The December Man – by Colleen Murphy
A Midsummer Night's Dream – by William Shakespeare

2008–2009
Wild Dogs – by Anne Hardcastle
Frost/Nixon – by Peter Morgan
It's a Wonderful Life – by Philip Grecian
Miss Julie: Freedom Summer – by Stephen Sachs
Blackbird – by David Harrower
Shirley Valentine – by Willy Russell
Hardsell – by Daniel Brooks and Rick Miller
Doubt: A Parable – by John Patrick Shanley
A Midsummer Night's Dream – by William Shakespeare

2009–2010
Rock'N'Roll – by Tom Stoppard
7 Stories – by Morris Panych
Intimate Apparel – by Lynn Nottage
'Art' – by Yasmina Reza
Frankenstein – by Mary Shelley, adapted by Jonathan Christenson
That Face – by Polly Stenham
The Overwhelming – by J. T. Rogers
This Is What Happens Next – by Daniel MacIvor and Daniel Brooks
 The Tempest – by William Shakespeare

2010–11
Fernando Krapp Wrote Me This Letter – by Tankred Dorst
The List – by Jennifer Tremblay, translated by Shelley Tepperman
The Andersen Project – written and directed by Robert Lepage
Studies in Motion: The Hauntings of Eadweard Muybridge – by Kevin Kerr
Saint Carmen of the Main – by Michel Tremblay, translated by Linda Gaboriau
The Middle Place – by Andrew Kushnir
Spotlight: Italy
Our Class – by Tadeusz Slobodzianek, English version by Ryan Craig
The Cosmonaut's Last Message to the Woman He Once Loved in the Former Soviet Union – by David Greig
Untitled – by Édouard Lock
Romeo and Juliet – by William Shakespeare

2011–2012
Another Africa: plays from Volcano Theatre's the Africa Trilogy – by Binyavanga Wainaina and Roland Schimmelpfennig
I Send You This Cadmium Red – music by Gavin Bryars, texts by John Berger and John Christie
The Test – by Lukas Barfuss
Orpheus and Eurydice – choreography and direction by Marie Chouinard
Red – by John Logan
Cruel and Tender – by Martin Crimp
Beckett: Feck It! – music directors Dáirine ní Mheadhra and John Hess
The You Show – by Crystal Pite
Clybourne Park – by Bruce Norris
The Game of Love and Chance – by Pierre de Marivaux adapted by Nicolas Billon
 The Winter's Tale – by William Shakespeare

2012–2013
Tear the Curtain! – by Jonathon Young and Kevin Kerr
Political Mother – choreography, direction and original music by Hofesh Shechter
Speaking in Tongues – by Andrew Bovell
The Arsonists – by Max Frisch, translated by Alistair Beaton
Ignorance – by The Old Trout Puppet Workshop
Someone Else – by Kristen Thomson
Spotlight Japan: A Celebration of High-Tech, Contemporary Japanese Theatre and Dance
This – by Melissa James Gibson
Race – by David Mamet
The Golden Mean (Live) – choreographed by Marie Chouinard
 A Midsummer Night's Dream – by William Shakespeare

2013–2014
The Flood Thereafter – by Sarah Berthiaume, translated by Nadine Desrochers
Venus in Fur – by David Ives
Yukonstyle – by Sarah Berthiaume, translated by Nadine Desrochers
DESH – choreographed and performed by Akram Khan
Winners and Losers – written and performed by Marcus Youssef and James Long
Needles and Opium – written and directed by Robert Lepage
London Road – by Alecky Blythe and Adam Cork
Tribes – by Nina Raine
Belleville – by Amy Herzog
The Tempest Replica – choreographed and directed by Crystal Pite
 Macbeth – by William Shakespeare
 The Taming of the Shrew – by William Shakespeare

2014–2015
Kiss and Cry – by Michele Anne De Mey and Jaco Van Dormael
What Makes A Man – by Jennifer Tarver based on the music of Charles Aznavour
Helen Lawrence – by Chris Haddock
Older and Reckless – conceived and curated by Claudia Moore
Opus – choreographed and staged by Yaron Lifschitz
Venus in Fur – by David Ives
The Seagull – by Anton Chekhov
The Other Place – by Sharr White
Harper Regan – by Simon Stephens
Nongogo – by Athol Fugard
The Meal and Hatched – by Mamela Nyamza
Ubu and the Truth Commission – by William Kentridge in collaboration with the Handspring Puppet Company
Dominion – choreographed by Luyanda Sidiya
Chandelier – by Steven Cohen
As You Like It – by William Shakespeare
Titus Andronicus – by William Shakespeare

2015–2016
Beckett Trilogy – by Samuel Beckett
 Julie – composed by Philippe Boesmans with a libretto by Luc Bondy and Marie-Louise Bischofberger
Domesticated – by Bruce Norris
Hedda Gabler – by Henrik Ibsen
Kiss and Cry – by Michele Anne De Mey and Jaco Van Dormael
Cold Blood – by Michele Anne De Mey and Jaco Van Dormael
Betroffenheit – by Crystal Pite and Jonathon Young
Toro – by Akram Khan
Celebration de la Francophonie – featuring Melissa Laveaux and Lisa LeBlanc
Chimerica – by Lucy Kirkwood
Das Ding (the thing) – by Philipp Lohle
Botticelli in the Fire and Sunday in Sodom – by Jordan Tannahill
Julius Caesar – by William Shakespeare
The Comedy of Errors – by William Shakespeare

2016–2017
Concord Floral – by Jordan Tannahill
All But Gone: A Beckett Rhapsody – featuring short plays by Samuel Beckett
Constellations – by Nick Payne
Dollhouse – conceived and choreographed by Bill Coleman
Who Killed Spalding Gray? – by Daniel MacIvor
Bosch – choreographed by Marie Chouinard
Liv Stein – by Nino Haratischwili
Five Faces for Evelyn Frost – by Guillaume Corbeil
Cirkopolis – by Cirque Eloize
Kiss – by Guillermo Calderon
887 – by Robert Lepage
Jack Charles v the crown – by Jack Charles
Blood Links – by William Yang
Endings – by Tamara Saulwick
Meeting – choreographed by Antony Hamilton
The Return – by Circa
Hamlet – by William Shakespeare
All's Well That Ends Well – by William Shakespeare

2017–2018
Life After – by Britta Johnson
Backbone – choreographed by Jera Wolfe and conceived by Sandra Laronde
Triptyque – by The 7 Fingers (7 doigts de la main)
Heisenberg – by Simon Stephens
Declarations – by Jordan Tannahill
 The Humans – by Stephen Karam
he who falls (celui qui tombe) – conceived by Yoann Bourgeois
Musica Nuda – featuring Petra Magoni & Ferruccio Spinetti
In This Body – conceived by Fides Krucker
Tanya Tagaq + Laakkuluk Williamson Bathory – by Tanya Tagaq + Laakkuluk Williamson Bathory
Betroffenheit – by Crystal Pite and Jonathon Young
The Overcoat: A Musical Tailoring – music by James Rolfe and libretto by Morris Panych
Love and Information – by Caryl Churchill
picnic in the cemetery – by Njo Kong Kie
King Lear – by William Shakespeare
Twelfth Night – by William Shakespeare

2018–2019
The Children – by Lucy Kirkwood
Xenos – choreographed by Akram Khan, written by Jordan Tannahill
Trace – conceived by Sandra Laronde
Grand Finale – choreographed by Hofesh Shechter
Every Brilliant Thing – by Duncan MacMillan
Tartuffe – by Moliere
Prince Hamlet – by William Shakespeare, adapted by Ravi Jain
who we are in the dark – choreographed by Peggy Baker, featuring Jeremy Gara and Sarah Neufeld of Arcade Fire
Revisor – by Crystal Pite and Jonathon Young
Unsafe – by Sook-Ying Lee and Zack Russell
Bigre – by Pierre Guillois, Agathe L'Huillier, and Olivier Martin Salvan
887 – by Robert Lepage
I Swallowed a Moon Made of Iron – by Njo Kong Kie
By Heart – by Tiago Rodrigues
The Full Light of Day – by Daniel Brooks and Kim Collier
Romeo and Juliet – by William Shakespeare
A Midsummer Night's Dream – by William Shakespeare

See also
Soulpepper Theatre Company production history (1998), Toronto
Theatre Passe Muraille production history (1969), Toronto

References

Canadian theatre company production histories
Theatre in Toronto